Irma Santonil Adlawan (born March 7, 1962) is a Filipino stage, television and film actress. She is dubbed as the “Queen of Independent Cinema” for her acting prowess and exceptional contribution to Philippine film industry. 

Adlawan is a FAMAS Award winner. She won "Best Actress" at the 9th Cinemalaya Independent Film Festival. In 2016, she won another "Best Actress" trophy at the Metro Manila Film Festival, winning against the Superstar Nora Aunor. The same year, she won "Outstanding Female Lead Performance in a Play" at the 8th Philstage Gawad Buhay Awards. Her performance in the MMK episode “Passport” was met with acclaims and praises from both critics and viewers, winning "Best Actress in a Single Drama Performance" at the 9th EdukCircle Awards. In 2020, she participated among the five entries for the European Philippine International Film Festival (EPIFF).

Biography

Early life
Adlawan was born in Tondo, Manila, the daughter of Conrada Santonil, a housewife, and Pedro Adlawan, a retired colonel. She attended St. Mary Magdalene School in Cavite and became a student of Speech and Drama at the University of the Philippines–Diliman, having transferred from its Manila campus.

Career
Her first stage role was Helena from Shakespeare's A Midsummer Night's Dream, which she performed for Dulaang UP in 1983 under the direction of its founder, Tony Mabesa. He had asked her to audition, and she was subsequently cast. From then on she had become a regular of Dulaang UP, starring in productions such as Chekhov's Three Sisters, Betti's The Queen and the Rebels, Fay and Michael Kanin's Rashomon, and Molière's The Misanthrope, as well as a multitude of other plays.

After UP, Adlawan became a member of Tanghalang Pilipino's Actors Company from 1991 to 1998, performing in numerous stage plays. Some of her most notable roles include a Chinese film producer, based on Regal Films matriarch Mother Lily Monteverde in Dennis Marasigan's Ang Buhay Ay Pelikula; Zafira in Francisco Balagtas' Orosman at Zafira; Sisa in the Cayabyab-Lumbera musical adaptation of José Rizal's Noli Me Tangere; and Teodora Alonso in Nonon Padilla and Rene O. Villanueva's Teodora. For Buhay Ay Pelikula she was cited as Best Actress of the Year by the Young Critics Circle in 1992, while for Teodora her performance as the mother of Philippine hero José Rizal was praised by National Artist for Dance Leonor Orosa-Goquingco for "[accomplishing] her histrionic feat, her splendid tour de force [with such ease, passion, range, verisimilitude and transparency]."

Some of Adlawan's early mainstream film roles include a victim of incestuous rape in Jeffrey Jeturian's Tuhog in 2001 and a public school teacher in Mga Munting Tinig in 2002, both of which earned her a Best Supporting Actress nomination at the Gawad Urian Awards. Three years later, in 2005, during the advent of digital cinema, she starred in three independent films: ICU Bed #7, where she played Eddie Garcia's daughter; Sa North Diversion Road, which had been adapted for film and had her reprising her role from mid-90s theatre alongside John Arcilla, where they played 10 different couples dealing with infidelity; and Mga Pusang Gala, based on the Palanca award-winning screenplay by Rody Vera and Jun Lana, where she played the role of Marta, a single middle-aged advertising practitioner. She received Best Actress nods for her performances in Sa North and Mga Pusang Gala. She continued to act in indies, playing lead and supporting roles from 2006 onwards. Her performance as Aling Carmen in Ataul: For Rent in 2007 earned her a FAMAS Best Supporting Actress award.

Her early television credits include appearances in Cecile Guidote-Alvarez's Balintataw, Behn Cervantes' Angkan, and Mario O'Hara's Mama. Later on, she would appear frequently in primetime teleseryes such as Sa Dulo Ng Walang Hanggan, Kay Tagal Kang Hinintay, Mga Anghel na Walang Langit, and Encantadia. In 2006, she was cast in the recurring role of Imelda Magsaysay, the mother of Celine Magsaysay (played by Anne Curtis), in the highly successful ABS-CBN teleserye, Maging Sino Ka Man. Her other TV credits include Clara Rivero in Lobo, Margarita Fortalejo-Cervantes in Precious Hearts Romances Presents: Kristine in 2010, Mantal in Amaya in 2011, and numerous guest appearances in ABS-CBN and GMA Network's respective drama anthologies, Maalaala Mo Kaya and Magpakailanman.

While regularly appearing in teleseryes and acting in independent films, Adlawan continued to perform on the stage, and in 2008 she was inducted into the Aliw Awards Hall of Fame for her three Best Stage Actress wins in 100 Hundred Songs of Mary Helen Fee, Speaking in Tongues, and Ang Pokpok ng Ohio. That same year, she starred in Tanghalang Pilipino's production of David Henry Hwang's The Golden Child and alternated with Missy Maramara as Desdemona in Tanghalang Ateneo's adaptation of Shakespeare's Othello. The following year, in 2009, she portrayed the role of Candida Marasigan—which she would continue to reprise four more times in the next five years—in Nick Joaquin's A Portrait of the Artist as Filipino in a staging by Repertory Philippines.

That same year, Adlawan starred in Alvin Yapan's Cinemalaya film Ang Panggagahasa Kay Fe, for which she received another Best Actress nomination at the Gawad Urian Awards. She also reprised her role as Baby Magtalas, the mother of Laida Magtalas (played by Sarah Geronimo) in the sequel of A Very Special Love, You Changed My Life. In 2010, she starred in the Cinemalaya film Vox Populi, playing the role of Connie de Gracia, a politician's daughter running for office. In the following years, she returned to Dulaang UP by way of Wilfrido Ma. Guerrero's Forsaken House and again reprised her role as Baby Magtalas in It Takes a Man and a Woman. She also appeared in ABS-CBN's Got to Believe as Joaquin's nanny, Yaya Puring and Be Careful With My Heart as Vicky Reyes, Maya's adviser. Adlawan was also cast as Principal May, the corrupt principal of a public school in Titser, a miniseries produced for GMA News and Public Affairs.

At the 9th Cinemalaya Film Festival, she received a Balanghai Trophy for Best Actress in the New Breed Category for her performance in Transit as Janet, an OFW working in Israel "struggling to keep her family together amid threats of cultural dislocation." She also received a Special Jury Citation for Ensemble Acting which she shares with Ping Medina, Jasmine Curtis-Smith, Mercedes Cabral, Marc Justine Alvarez, and Yatzuck Azuz. In 2014, she starred in Ronnie Lazaro's directorial debut Edna, a film that again tackles the stories of OFWs. She played the role of Edna dela Costa, a Filipino caregiver returning home to find a changed family. Adlawan was also part of The Janitor, an entry in the Directors Showcase category of Cinemalaya X. Later in the year, she joined the cast of Liza Soberano and Enrique Gil's launching teleserye Forevermore, as Mirasol, one of the farmers in their community and a maternal figure to Soberano's character, Agnes.

In 2015, she continued to appear in ABS-CBN and GMA's drama anthologies, as well as their seasonal television specials and was cast in supporting roles in several films, including Sleepless, a QCinema Film Festival offering and Walang Forever, an entry to the 41st Metro Manila Film Festival. In October of the same year, she returned to the stage, with much critical acclaim, through Tanghalang Pilipino's Mga Buhay na Apoy, Kanakan-Balintagos' Palanca-award winning play. Adlawan was also cast in Destiny Rose as Bethilda Vitto, one of the show's antagonists. She also received a Best Supporting Actress nod for her performance as Mirasol in Forevermore at the 29th PMPC Star Awards for Television.

The following year, Adlawan took home the Gawad BUHAY! award for Outstanding Lead Female Performance in a Play for her performance as Soledad Santos in Mga Buhay na Apoy. She continued to appear in various television shows and movies and made a return to the Virgin Lab Fest stage in Kanakan Balintagos' Loyalist. Later in the year, Adlawan eventually replaced Nora Aunor in the Metro Manila Film Festival entry, Oro, and ultimately went on to win a Best Actress award for it.

Personal life
Adlawan married actor/writer/director Dennis Marasigan, whom she met during their time at the UP and with whom she has four children. He has directed her in several of his films: Sa North Diversion Road, Tukso, and Vox Populi. They are separated.

Filmography

Films

*: shared with Ping Medina, Jasmine Curtis-Smith, Mercedes Cabral, and Marc Justine Alvarez.

Television

Theatre

Awards and nominations

References

External links
 

1962 births
Living people
Filipino television actresses
Filipino film actresses
People from Tondo, Manila
Actresses from Manila
People from Kawit, Cavite
University of the Philippines Diliman alumni
Filipino stage actresses
ABS-CBN personalities
GMA Network personalities
Viva Artists Agency